Rodemack (German: Rodemachern; Lorraine Franconian: Ruedemaacher/Roudemaacher) is a commune in the Moselle department in Grand Est in northeastern France.

Localities of the commune: Esing, Faulbach, Semming.

Personalities related to the municipality
 Jean-Marie Pelt (1933-2015), French botanist-ecologist, founder of the European Institute of Ecology (Metz).
 The barons of Rodemack, lineage of the nobility of the Holy Roman Empire, which has its roots in Rodemack.
 Pierre Hemmer (1950-2013), one of the Internet pioneers in Switzerland.
 Princess Cecilia of Sweden

See also
 Communes of the Moselle department

References

External links
 

Communes of Moselle (department)
Plus Beaux Villages de France